Muhammad Yar Khuhawar is a Pakistani analytical chemist who is Professor Emeritus at the Institute of Advanced Research Studies in Chemical Sciences, University of Sindh, Jamshoro.

He is working with more than 50 researchers, focusing in the field of chromatography and electrophoresis for analytical method development for metals, non-metals and biological active compounds from a wide variety of samples. His research group has synthesized a number of Schiff base polymers and has developed a new stationary phase for Gas Chromatography and sensitive Liquid Chromatography procedures for the determination of pesticide malathion.

He has also published a number of research papers in the field of environmental monitoring of water resources of Sindh province including: Indus River, canals, lakes, natural springs, sea, underground water resources, municipal sewerage and receiving bodies in terms of pollution and utilities for biological life inhabiting the area.

He has a Ph.D. in Chemistry from Birmingham University, United Kingdom, and was awarded the degree of Doctor of Science (D.Sc.) from University of Birmingham, in 2000. He has more than 250 research publications in national and international journals.

References

External links 
  http://www.ceacsu.edu.pk/Faculty/Journal.htm
  http://www.rsc.org/publishing/journals/AN/article.asp?doi=AN9921701725
  http://www.aasci.org/conference/env/2007/Presentation-schedule-EST2007.pdf
  https://j-chrom-sci.com/abstracts/2010/april/303-khuhawar.html
  https://web.archive.org/web/20130816031319/http://htcrl.usindh.edu.pk/
  http://iarscs.usindh.edu.pk/

Pakistani chemists
Living people
1948 births
Academic staff of the University of Sindh
Sindhi people
Alumni of the University of Birmingham